Allesley Green is a modern suburb of Coventry in the West Midlands, England, within the civil parish of Allesley.

Most of the housing dates from the late-1980s. It is bounded by the districts of Eastern Green to the southwest, Mount Nod to the south and Allesley Park to the east.

Suburbs of Coventry